German submarine U-462 was a Type XIV supply and replenishment U-boat ("Milchkuh") of Nazi Germany's Kriegsmarine during World War II.

Her keel was laid down on 2 January 1941, by Deutsche Werke in Kiel. She was launched on 29 November 1941 and commissioned on 5 March 1942 with Oberleutnant zur See Bruno Vowe in command. Vowe commanded the boat until she was lost. She served, first as part of the 4th U-boat Flotilla while carrying out training, then as part of the 10th and 12th flotillas while taking part in operations.

Design
German Type XIV submarines were shortened versions of the Type IXDs they were based on.‘’U-462’’ had a displacement of  when at the surface and  while submerged. She had two shafts and two propellers.

The boat had a complement of fifty-three.

Operational career
U-462 conducted eight patrols. As a supply boat, she avoided combat.

First patrol
For her first patrol, U-462 departed Kiel on 23 July 1942 and arrived at St. Nazaire in occupied France on 21 September of the same year, having travelled by way of the gap between Iceland and the Faeroe Islands and out into the Atlantic. The latter part of the voyage took her past the Azores on her way to her new base.

Second and third patrols
The U-boat's second effort took her to a point west-southwest of the Cape Verde Islands which she reached on 9 November 1942. She arrived back at St. Nazaire on 7 December 1942.

Her third outing was very short. She left Bordeaux on 20 January 1943, but returned on the 22nd.

Fourth and fifth patrols
The submarine's fourth sortie took her out into the Atlantic once again. The most westerly spot of this patrol was recorded on 27 February 1943. She returned to France, but this time it was to Bordeaux, on 11 March.

The boat's fifth patrol was also routine.

Sixth patrol
She did not leave the Bay of Biscay, being attacked by Mosquito aircraft of 151 and 156 squadrons, RAF on 21 June 1943. One man was killed (Matrosengefreiter Ferdinand Brunnbaur), and four more were wounded. The patrol was aborted, the boat returned to Bordeaux on the 23rd.

Seventh patrol
U-462s seventh patrol was also cut short. She had barely cleared the northwest Spanish coast when she was attacked by a British B-24 Liberator of 224 squadron, RAF. After sustaining sufficient damage to force a return, she entered Bordeaux harbour on 6 July 1943.

Loss
One crewman was killed; the other 64 survived.

Wolfpacks
U-462 took part in one wolfpack, namely:
 Lohs (29 August – 2 September 1942)

References

Bibliography

External links
 

German Type XIV submarines
U-boats commissioned in 1942
U-boats sunk in 1943
World War II submarines of Germany
Shipwrecks in the Bay of Biscay
1941 ships
World War II shipwrecks in the Atlantic Ocean
Ships built in Kiel
U-boats sunk by British aircraft
U-boats sunk by British warships
Maritime incidents in July 1943